The 2007 season of the ASFA Soccer League was the twenty seventh season of association football competition in American Samoa. Konica FC won the championship, their second recorded title, with the winners of the 1998 league competition and a number of previous seasons unknown.

League Setup
The league was initially based on two groups of seven teams who played each other on a round robin basis, the top two qualifying for the semi-finals.

Group stage

Pool 1

Pool 1 results

Pool 2

Pool 2 results

Semifinals

Final

References

FFAS Senior League seasons
Amer
2007 in American Samoan sports